Holly Grove School may refer to:

in England
Holly Grove School, Lancashire, one of Lancashire's schools

in the United States
Holly Grove School (Stevens Creek, Arkansas), listed on the NRHP in White County, Arkansas

See also
Holly Grove (disambiguation)